Şenol Güneş  (born 1 June 1952) is a Turkish football manager and former player who currently manages Süper Lig club Beşiktaş. His most notable managerial achievements to date include coaching the Turkey national team to third place in the 2002 FIFA World Cup and winning two Süper Lig titles; both of them with Beşiktaş. He is also noted for stints in his boyhood club Trabzonspor, which plays their current games in a stadium named after him. His playing career there saw the club win 6 of their 7 Süper Lig titles.

Playing career
Güneş began his amateur career at Erdoğdu Gençlik as a goalkeeper. Shortly after he was recruited for the Trabzonspor development team, and began playing for the senior team soon after. He played for Trabzonspor for twelve years between 1975 and 1987. During this period he won six league championships. In the 1978–79 season he set the Süper Lig clean sheet record by not conceding a single goal for 1,110 minutes. He was part of the "Trabzonpor Efsanesi" (literally "The Legend of Trabzonspor", a name given by the Turkish press) along with other local players such as Turgay Semercioğlu, Necmi Perekli, and Ali Kemal Denizci. Güneş has 31 caps for the Turkish national team, being the captain in five games.

Managerial career
His managerial career started at Trabzonspor, where he was assistant manager before being promoted. He came close to winning Süper Lig in the 1995–96 campaign after leading all season, but in the end his team came second. That year, Trabzonspor also played in the 1996–97 UEFA Cup where they were knocked out by FC Schalke 04. He left the club soon after, and worked at Antalyaspor and Sakaryaspor.

In 2000, he was hired to manage the Turkish national football team. Turkey qualified for the 2002 FIFA World Cup and finished third. Güneş won the UEFA Coach of the Year award for 2002. After the World Cup, he received many offers from Greece, Brazil, and Spain, but he wanted to stay with Turkey. After the national team failed to qualify for UEFA Euro 2004, Güneş was sacked as manager.

He returned to Trabzonspor in January 2005, signing a three and a half year contract but left after finishing narrowly in second place. At this time there were rumours that Güneş would be taking a coaching job in Iran or in the United Arab Emirates.

On 8 December 2006, FC Seoul, one of the leading football clubs in the K League, announced their three-year contract with Güneş starting from 2007.

Three years later, Güneş returned to his hometown as head coach of Trabzonspor for the fourth time, replacing Hugo Broos. In the 2010-11 campaign he again led the entire season with Trabzonspor but finished second once again at the end of the season. Later it was revealed the 2011 Turkish sports corruption scandal was the main cause of this. After Trabzonspor, he signed with Bursaspor on a one-year contract. Bursaspor finished 6th place in 2014–15 Süper Lig and reached the Turkish Cup final that year. On 11 June 2015, he signed with a 2+1 year contract with Beşiktaş. Güneş led Beşiktaş to their 14th title (and first since 2009) in 2016. For Güneş, it was his first title as manager. He led them to their 15th and second title in a row in 2017.

On 28 February 2019, it was announced that Güneş would take the Turkey national team managerial post for a second time on a four-year deal, 15 years after his last stint, effective from 1 June 2019.
He oversaw Turkey's 2–0 win over Albania in the opening UEFA Euro 2020 qualifiers.

On 28 October 2022, Güneş joined Beşiktaş for his second stint, following the departure of French head coach Valérien Ismaël.

Personal life
Güneş was born in Trabzon, Turkey, and graduated from Karadeniz Technical University. He taught at a middle school in Trabzon between 1978 and 1983.

He and his wife Semra have two daughters.

Career statistics

Club

International

Managerial statistics

Honours

Player
Sources:

Trabzonspor
Süper Lig: 1975–76, 1976–77, 1978–79, 1979–80, 1980–81, 1983–84
Turkish Cup: 1976–77, 1977–78, 1983–84
Turkish Super Cup: 1976, 1977, 1978, 1979, 1980, 1983

Manager
Trabzonspor
Turkish Cup: 1994–95, 2009–10
Turkish Super Cup: 1995, 2010

Turkey
FIFA World Cup: third place: 2002
FIFA Confederations Cup: third place: 2003

Beşiktaş
Süper Lig: 2015–16, 2016–17

Awards and achievements
UEFA Team of the Year: 2002
IFFHS's third best national team coach of the world 2002
2002 Turkish State Medal of Distinguished Service

See also
 Şenol Güneş Stadium

Notes

References

External links

 

 

1952 births
Living people
Sportspeople from Trabzon
Turkish footballers
Association football goalkeepers
Akçaabat Sebatspor footballers
Trabzonspor footballers
Süper Lig players
Turkey international footballers
Turkish football managers
Boluspor managers
İstanbulspor managers
Trabzonspor managers
Antalyaspor managers
Sakaryaspor managers
Turkey national football team managers
FC Seoul managers
Bursaspor managers
Beşiktaş J.K. managers
Süper Lig managers
K League 1 managers
2002 FIFA World Cup managers
2003 FIFA Confederations Cup managers
UEFA Euro 2020 managers
Turkish expatriate football managers
Turkish expatriate sportspeople in South Korea
Expatriate football managers in South Korea
Recipients of the State Medal of Distinguished Service